In electromagnetism, the impedance of free space, is a physical constant relating the magnitudes of the electric and magnetic fields of electromagnetic radiation travelling through free space. That is, 
 
Its presently accepted  value is

.

Where Ω is the ohm, the SI unit of electrical resistance. The impedance of free space (that is the wave impedance of a plane wave in free space) is equal to the product of the vacuum permeability  and the speed of light in vacuum . Before 2019, the values of both these constants were taken to be exact (they were given in the definitions of the ampere and the metre respectively), and the value of the impedance of free space was therefore likewise taken to be exact. However, with the redefinition of the SI base units that came into force on 20 May 2019, the impedance of free space is subject to experimental measurement because only the speed of light in vacuum  retains an exactly defined value.

Terminology
The analogous quantity for a plane wave travelling through a dielectric medium is called the intrinsic impedance of the medium, and designated  (eta). Hence  is sometimes referred to as the intrinsic impedance of free space, and given the symbol . It has numerous other synonyms, including:

 wave impedance of free space,
 the vacuum impedance,
 intrinsic impedance of vacuum,
 characteristic impedance of vacuum,
 wave resistance of free space.

Relation to other constants

From the above definition, and the plane wave solution to Maxwell's equations,

where
 is the magnetic constant, also known as the permeability of free space ≈  Henries/meter,
 is the electric constant, also known as the permittivity of free space ≈  Farads/meter,
 is the speed of light in free space.

Historical exact value

Consequently until the 2019 redefinition,
 exactly,
or
 exactly,
or

This chain of dependencies changed when the ampere was redefined on 20 May 2019.

Approximation as 120π ohms

For example, Cheng 1989 states that the radiation resistance of a Hertzian dipole is

  (result in ohms; not exact).

This practice may be recognized from the resulting discrepancy in the units of the given formula. Consideration of the units, or more formally dimensional analysis, may be used to restore the formula to a more exact form, in this case to

See also
Electromagnetic wave equation
Mathematical descriptions of the electromagnetic field
Near and far field
Sinusoidal plane-wave solutions of the electromagnetic wave equation
Space cloth
Vacuum
Wave impedance

References and notes

Further reading
 
 
Electromagnetism
Physical constants